Graham John Saville (born 5 February 1944) is a former English cricketer of the 1960s and 1970s. His main career was with Essex, whom he represented on 170 occasions at first-class or List A level, though he also turned out twice for Minor Counties in first-class games and twice for Norfolk in the Gillette Cup.

He was born in Leytonstone, Essex, and is the cousin of Graham Gooch.

External links

1944 births
Living people
English cricketers
Essex cricketers
Minor Counties cricketers
Norfolk cricketers
People from Leytonstone
Sportspeople from Essex